The following is a list of notable deaths in February 1991.

Entries for each day are listed alphabetically by surname. A typical entry lists information in the following sequence:
 Name, age, country of citizenship at birth, subsequent country of citizenship (if applicable), reason for notability, cause of death (if known), and reference.

February 1991

1
Sam Busich, 77, American football player.
Carol Dempster, 89, American silent film actress, heart failure.
Shiro Kuramata, 56, Japanese interior designer.
Jimmy MacDonald, 84, Scottish-American voice actor (Mickey Mouse) and sound effects designer, heart failure.
Herzl Rosenblum, 87, Lithuanian-born Israeli journalist.
Oscar Rudolph, 79, American television director, complications from a stroke.
Phil Watson, 76, Canadian ice hockey player and coach (New York Rangers).

2
Pete Axthelm, 47, American sports journalist, liver failure.
Maurice G. Burnside, 88, American politician, member of the U.S. House of Representatives (1949–1953, 1955–1957).
Lorang Christiansen, 74, Norwegian Olympic cyclist (1948, 1952).
Jack Daugherty, 60, American musician, complications from heart surgery.
Alan Green, 79, British politician.
Natalie Kingston, 85, American actress.
Franco Latini, 63, Italian actor and voice actor, stroke.
Howie Rader, 69, American basketball player.
Stanislav Sorokin, 49, Soviet Olympic boxer (1964).
Aryness Joy Wickens, 90, American statistician.

3
Harry Ackerman, 78, American television producer (Bewitched, The Flying Nun, Hazel).
Walter Brown, 75, American baseball player.
Ernst Kalwitzki, 81, German football player.
Nancy Kulp, 69, American actress (The Beverly Hillbillies, The Aristocats, The Parent Trap), cancer.

4
Juozas Baltušis, 81, Lithuanian writer.
Károly Bartha, 83, Hungarian Olympic swimmer (1924).
Johannes Pløger, 68, Danish football player.
Harry Lancaster Towe, 92, American politician, member of the U.S. House of Representatives (1943–1951).
Eleni Skoura, 94, Greek politician.

5
Pedro Arrupe, 83, Spanish Jesuit priest.
Lawrence Gowing, 72, English artist, heart attack.
Dean Jagger, 87, American actor (Twelve O'Clock High, White Christmas, Mr. Novak), Oscar winner (1950).
James L. Knight, 81, American newspaper publisher.
Margarethe von Oven, 86, German secretary and 20 July plot accomplice .

6
John Paul Elford, 68, American Roman Catholic prelate.
Salvador Luria, 78, Italian-American microbiologist, Nobel Prize recipient (1969), heart attack.
Bassett Maguire, 86, American botanist, kidney failure.
Alex McColl, 96, American baseball player.
George McNaughton, 93, Canadian ice hockey player.
Danny Thomas, 79, American actor (The Danny Thomas Show, The Jazz Singer, Big City) and philanthropist, Emmy winner (1955), heart attack.
María Zambrano, 86, Spanish writer.

7
Otto Friedrich Bollnow, 87, German philosopher.
George Detore, 84, American baseball player (Cleveland Indians).
John War Eagle, 89, American Sioux actor (Tonka, Tomahawk, Westward Ho, the Wagons!).
Werner Fuetterer, 84, German actor.
John Guise, 76, Papua New Guinean politician, governor-general (1975–1977).
Don McDougall, 73, American television director (The Virginian, Bonanza, The Dukes of Hazzard).
Jean-Paul Mousseau, 64, Canadian artist.
John Steinbeck IV, 44, American journalist, complications from spinal surgery.
Dick Winslow, 75, American actor (Tom Sawyer, King Creole, The Apple Dumpling Gang), diabetes.
Amos Yarkoni, 70, Bedouin-Israeli military officer and civil servant, cancer.

8
Aris T. Allen, 80, American politician, suicide.
Hubert M. Blalock, Jr., 64, American sociologist.
Miran Bux, 83, Pakistani cricket player.
Silvio O. Conte, 69, American politician, member of the U.S. House of Representatives (since 1959), prostate cancer.
Daphne Jackson, 54, English nuclear physicist, cancer.
James Jacoby, 57, American bridge player, cancer.
Casimir Lewy, 71, Polish philosopher.
Evan Luard, 64, English politician.
Aaron Siskind, 87, American photographer, stroke.

9
James Cleveland, 59, American gospel singer, heart failure.
John Sloan Dickey, 83, American academic.
Walter Klien, 62, Austrian pianist.
Daigoro Kondo, 83, Japanese footballer, intracranial hemorrhage.
Fatma Memik, 87-88, Turkish politician.
Arkady Migdal, 79, Soviet physicist and member of the USSR Academy of Sciences.
Edward H. Schafer, 77, American historian, liver cancer.
Cliff Shaw, 68, American programmer.

10
William Foley, 59, Australian Roman Catholic archbishop.
Rowe Harding, 89, Welsh rugby player.
Bernard Lee, 55, American civil rights activist, heart failure.
Marion Roper, 80, American Olympic diver (1932).
Marcel Tolkowsky, 91, Belgian diamond cutter.

11
Ricardo Gullón, 82, Spanish writer.
Bohumil Kudrna, 70, Czechoslovak Olympic canoeist (1948, 1952).
Ruth Landes, 82, American anthropologist.
Pete Parker, 95, Canadian radio announcer.

12
Wilhelm Brinkmann, 80, German Olympic handball player (1936).
Liu Chieh, 83, Taiwanese diplomat, cerebral hemorrhage.
Norman Fisher, 74, New Zealand boxer.
Ruth Morley, 65, Austrian-American costume designer (Superman, Taxi Driver, Tootsie), breast cancer.
Roger Patterson, 22, American bassist (Atheist), traffic collision.
Robert F. Wagner, 80, American politician, mayor of New York City (1954–1965), bladder cancer.

13
Arno Breker, 90, German architect and sculptor.
Gunnar Hultgren, 88, Swedish archbishop.
Flaviano Labò, 64, Italian singer, traffic collision.
Ron Pickering, 60, British sports commentator.
Georg Moritz, Hereditary Prince of Saxe-Altenburg, 90, German royal, head of the house of Saxe-Altenburg (since 1955).
Heinz Willeg, 72, German film producer.

14
Alex Clark, 74, American politician, head injury.
Felix Gilbert, 85, German-American historian.
Pafsanias Katsotas, 95, Greek Army general and politician.
Alfred R. Lindesmith, 85, American sociologist.
John A. McCone, 89, American politician, Director of Central Intelligence (1961–1965), cardiac arrest.
Kim Slavin, 62, Soviet and Russian painter.
José Ádem, 69, Mexican mathematician.

15
Virginia Mae Brown, 67, American civil servant, heart attack.
Alfred Gleisner, 82, German politician.
David Herlihy, 60, American historian.
Birger Malmsten, 70, Swedish actor.
Tillie Manton, 80, American football player.
George Motola, 71, American record producer.
Ernest Robert Sears, 80, American agricultural geneticist.
Ivan Shkadov, 77, Soviet general, traffic accident.
Earl E. T. Smith, 87, American politician and diplomat.
István Ströck, 90, Romanian football player.

16
Enrique Bermúdez, 58, Nicaraguan soldier, shot.
Bob Geddins, 78, American musician, liver cancer.
Luis Escobar Kirkpatrick, 82, Spanish actor and noble.
Bobby Maples, 48, American football player (Houston Oilers, Denver Broncos, Pittsburgh Steelers), Hodgkin's lymphoma.
Didar Sandhu, 48, Indian folk singer and songwriter.

17
Gitta Alpár, 88, Hungarian-American opera singer.
Madina Gulgun, 65, Iranian-Soviet poet.
Louis O. Kelso, 77, American economist.
Miroslav Macháček, 68, Czechoslovak actor.
Jean Palluch, 67, French football player (b.1923).
Francis Pearson, 79, British politician and colonial administrator.
Hans Thimig, 90, Austrian actor and director.
Travis Williams, 45, American football player, heart failure.

18
Francesc de Borja Moll i Casasnovas, 87, Spanish linguist.
Eugene Fodor, 85, Hungarian-American writer.
Dick Hart, 63, American Olympic long-distance runner (1956).
Fulke Walwyn, 80, British jockey.
Zhang Wenjin, 76, Chinese diplomat.

19
Fad Browne, 84, Irish politician.
Arne Kleven, 91, Danish footballer.
Herbert Niemann, 55, German Olympic judoka (1964), suicide.
Milton S. Plesset, 83, American physicist.
Francis D. Rauber, 89, United States Marine Corps Sergeant Major.

20
Sir George Clark, 3rd Baronet, 77, Northern Irish politician.
Isabelle Delorme, 90, Canadian composer.
John Fetzer, 89, American sports executive.
Eugene Forsey, 86, Canadian politician.
Kenneth Hurlstone Jackson, 81, English linguist.
George Lennon, 90, Irish-American buddhist and republican leader.

21
Dorothy Auchterlonie, 75, English-born Australian poet.
John Sherman Cooper, 89, American politician and diplomat, member of the U.S. Senate (1946–1949, 1952–1955, 1956–1973), heart failure.
Margot Fonteyn, 71, English ballerina, ovarian cancer.
Oscar Christian Gundersen, 82, Norwegian politician.
Mordechai Ish-Shalom, 90, Israeli politician and labor leader.
Nutan, 54, Indian actress, breast cancer.
Frederick J. Pohl, 101, American author.
Abdurrahman Sharafkandi, 69, Iranian writer.

22
Ladislav Fialka, 59, Czechoslovak mime.
Eric Hosking, 81, English photographer.
William Loose, 80, American composer, heart attack.
Jimmy Pattison, 82, American baseball player.
Atanasie Protopopesco, 90, Romanian football player.

23
John Alfred Hannah, 88, American academic.
Argeliers León, 72, Cuban composer and musicologist.
Leo Thomas Maher, 75, American Roman Catholic prelate, brain cancer.
Gösta Persson, 87, Swedish Olympic swimmer (1924, 1936).
William Howard Taft III, 75, American diplomat, prostate cancer.

24
Georges Capdeville, 91, French football referee.
John Charles Daly, 77, American journalist and television personality, cardiac arrest, heart attack.
Robert B. Downs, 87, American librarian.
George Gobel, 71, American actor and comedian.
Shingo Kanemoto, 58, Japanese voice actor, intracerebral hemorrhage.
Stewart Morris, 81, British Olympic sailor (1948).
Webb Pierce, 69, American musician, pancreatic cancer.
Héctor Rial, 62, Argentine football player.
Jean Rogers, 74, American actress, surgical complications.
Lina Volonghi, 76, Italian actress.
Hans-Joachim Weise, 78, German Olympic sailor (1936).

25
John Dunning, 74, American film editor (Ben-Hur, Julius Caesar, Dr. Kildare), Oscar winner (1960).
Sverre Hansen, 91, Norwegian Olympic long jumper (1924).
Suleiman Ali Nashnush, 47-48, Libyan basketball player.
Otto Tibulski, 78, German footballer.
André Turp, 65, Canadian singer.

26
Bernard W. Burton, 92, American film editor.
Abraham Charité, 73, Dutch Olympic weightlifter (1948).
Slim Gaillard, 80, American musician, cancer.
Han Lih-wu, 88, Taiwanese diplomat.
William McMahon, 81, American Olympic long-distance runner (1936).
Jimmy Zinn, 96, American baseball player.

27
Owen Dougherty, 61, American sports coach, complications from heart surgery.
Florence Gilbert, 87, American silent film actress.
Leo Katcher, 79, American reporter, heart attack.
Martinho da Costa Lopes, 73, East Timorese religious and political leader.
Artie Mitchell, 45, American pornographer, shot.
Bob Widlar, 53, American electronics engineer, heart attack.

28
Reinhard Bendix, 75, German-American sociologist, heart attack.
Wassily Hoeffding, 76, Finnish-American statistician.
Prince Wenzel of Liechtenstein, 28, Liechtenstein royal.
Sante Monachesi, 81, Italian painter.
Guillermo Ungo, 59, Salvadoran politician.
Werner Wägelin, 77, Swiss Olympic cyclist (1936).

References 

1991-02
 02